Sam Husseini is a Jordanian-Palestinian writer and political activist. He is the communications director of the Institute for Public Accuracy, a D.C.-based nonprofit group that promotes progressive experts as alternative sources for mainstream media reporters. He formerly worked at the American-Arab Anti-Discrimination Committee and at the media watch group Fairness and Accuracy in Reporting. Husseini has written articles for a variety of publications, including CounterPunch, The Nation, The Washington Post, USA Today and Salon.

Early life
Husseini was born as Osama Husseini in 1966 to a Palestinian Christian father from Tiberias, and a Jordanian Christian mother. His parents immigrated to the United States when he was five years old. Husseini grew up in Queens in New York City. He became a US citizen in 1984.

Husseini is a graduate of Carnegie Mellon University, where he earned a double bachelor's degree in applied mathematics and logic and computation.

Career
After graduating, Husseini worked as a programmer and a math teacher. He then began working for Fairness and Accuracy in Reporting (FAIR) where he was the Middle East expert. After the 1993 World Trade Center bombing, he was in charge of monitoring news media for evidence of anti-Arab and anti-Muslim bias.

Husseini was the media director for the American-Arab Anti-Discrimination Committee.

After leaving FAIR, he became the communications director for the Institute for Public Accuracy, a position that he has held since 1997. In 2020, he was listed as a senior analyst for the Institute for Public Accuracy and a contributor to The Nation.

In 2000, he founded the webpage VotePact.org which encourages disenchanted Democrats to pair up with disenchanted Republicans and vote for third parties and independent candidates.

In 2006, Husseini founded the webpage WashingtonStakeout.com which features him pointedly questioning political figures as they leave Sunday morning talk shows.

In 2011, the executive director of the National Press Club suspended Husseini for asking questions of the Saudi ambassador to the US which some thought were "loaded statements." The Club's ethics committee lifted the suspension. Husseini asked Prince Turki al-Faisal, the former head of Saudi intelligence,

I want to know what legitimacy your regime has sir. You come before us, representative of one of the most autocratic, misogynistic regimes on the face of the earth. Human Rights Watch and other reports of torture detention of activist, you squelched the democratic uprising in Bahrain, you tried to overturn the democratic uprising in Egypt and indeed you continue to oppress your own people.

In 2018, he was removed from the 2018 Russia–United States summit press conference, prior to Trump and Putin's arrival in the room, when he held a sign saying, "Nuclear Weapon Ban Treaty," which the Russian authorities called a "malicious item". A CBS News reporter stated that he had been "heckling" reporters and two security detail members. Husseini said he had hoped to ask Trump a question regarding the first legally binding international agreement to prohibit nuclear weapons, with the goal of their total elimination.

Writing
Husseini has written about U.S. media coverage of the Arab–Israeli conflict. In 1994, he suggested that General Electric's many felony convictions should make the corporation ineligible to hold broadcast licenses.

Writing in Salon in 2020, Husseini suggested that the COVID-19 outbreak in Wuhan was possibly a result of a biowarfare laboratory discovering the virus in the wild, and studying it in the lab from which it escaped. He argued that the pandemic exposed the threat of a biowarfare arms race, which may lead to more pandemics in the future.

References

External links

 Extra! articles by Sam Husseini
 Sam Husseini's blog
 Institute for Public Accuracy

American media critics
American political writers
American male non-fiction writers
American bloggers
American journalists of Arab descent
American activists
American people of Palestinian descent
Living people
Carnegie Mellon University alumni
1966 births
Hunter College alumni
American people of Jordanian descent
21st-century American non-fiction writers
American male bloggers